Gardner High School is a public high school in Gardner, Massachusetts.

History
Gardner High School was established in 1872, with the first graduating class being the Class of 1876. In 1897, a school building was designed by the architecture firm Barker & Nourse and was located at 130 Elm Street.

In 1978, Walt Dubzinski, Class of 1937, was named principal of Gardner High. From 1946 to 1966, Dubzinski served as the school football coach, and was named assistant principal in 1966.

In 1943, Norman Rockwell donated his painting titled Willie Gillis in Convoy to Gardner High School. The work of art was auctioned off by Sotheby's in 2014 to benefit the school.

Athletics
Home of the Wildcats, Gardner High School athletic teams sport the colors of orange and black. The school offers athletic teams in a variety of sports, including: baseball, basketball, cheerleading, cross country , field hockey, football, golf, ice hockey, soccer, softball, swimming, tennis, and track and field.

Notable alumni
Samantha Arsenault, Olympic swimmer
Red Blanchard, radio personality
Jacques Cesaire (1998), professional football player
Karl Dean (1974), politician
Walt Dubzinski (1937), professional football player
Mark Gearan (1974), director of the Peace Corps
Hadassah Lieberman (1966), wife of Joe Lieberman
Bob Menne (1960), professional golfer
Frank Morze (1951), professional football player
Mark Pieloch (1975), business executive
Peter Roberts (1962), inventor
Robert D. Wetmore, politician
Jonathan Zlotnik (2008), politician

See also
List of high schools in Massachusetts

References

External links
Official website

Educational institutions established in 1872
Schools in Worcester County, Massachusetts
Public high schools in Massachusetts
Buildings and structures in Gardner, Massachusetts